Mulford may refer to:

Surname 
Anna Isabel Mulford (1848–1943), American botanist
Arthur Mulford (1871–?), English footballer
Chris Mulford (1941–2011), American activist
Clarence E. Mulford (1883–1956), American author
David Mulford (born 1937), United States Ambassador to India
Don Mulford (1915–2000), American republican
Elisha Mulford (1833–1885), American religious minister
F.B. Mulford, British expatriate
Prentice Mulford (1834–1891), literary humorist and Californian author
Ralph Mulford (1884–1973), American racecar driver
Samuel "Fish Hook" Mulford (1644–1725), New York legislator and whale oil merchant
Sidney Mulford (1896–1973), English footballer
Walter Mulford (1877–1955), American forester
Wendy Mulford (born 1941), British poet

Given name 
Charles Mulford Robinson (1869–1917), American journalist and writer
Mulford B. Foster (1888–1978), American botanist
Mulford Q. Sibley (1912–1989), American professor of political science
Mulford Winsor (1874–1956), American newspaperman
Fanny Rysan Mulford Hitchcock (1851–1936), American chemist

Places 
Mulford, San Leandro, California, a neighborhood in San Leandro, Alameda County, California
Mulford Farmhouse, an English colonial farmstead in East Hampton, Long Island, New York
Mulford Gardens, San Leandro, California, a neighborhood in San Leandro, Alameda County, California
Mulford Landing, San Leandro, California, a neighborhood in San Leandro, Alameda County, California
Mulford, Colorado
Terry-Mulford House, historic home located at Orient in Suffolk County, New York

Other 
Mulford Act, a 1967 California bill prohibiting the public carrying of loaded firearms
Mulford Building, a light manufacturing loft in Philadelphia
Mulford Creek (Cape Fear River tributary) in North Carolina
Mulford Expedition, 1921
Mulfords Run, a stream in Ohio
H. K. Mulford Company, a pharmacy

See also

Case law disambiguation pages